New Virginia can mean:

 New Virginia, Iowa
 The former New Virginia Colony in Mexico.
 Original name of a settlement that eventually became the suburb of Monrovia now known as Virginia, Liberia
 A candidate name for what became the state of West Virginia
 A reference to the post-Civil War state of Virginia, as opposed to Old Virginia
 The fictional nation in Conquistador (novel) by S. M. Stirling